The Hamilton River is a river in the Marlborough region of the South Island of New Zealand. It is a tributary of the Wairau River.

References

Rivers of the Marlborough Region
Rivers of New Zealand